Tuctopunta (possibly from Quechua tuqtu broody hen, punta peak; ridge; first, before, in front of) is a  mountain in the Cordillera Blanca in the Andes of Peru. It is located in the Ancash Region, Huaraz Province, Olleros District. Tuctopunta lies northwest of Tuctu and southwest of Uruashraju and Arhuay.

References 

Mountains of Peru
Mountains of Ancash Region